is a Japanese college basketball player for the Nebraska Cornhuskers of the Big Ten Conference. He previously played for Ranger College. Tominaga has been a member of the Japan men's national basketball team and the national 3x3 team.

High school career
Tominaga attended Sakuragaoka Gakuen High School in Aichi Prefecture and played for its basketball team. As a senior, he averaged 39.8 points per game at the All-Japan Championship, an annual national high school tournament. During the third-place game, he posted a tournament-high 46 points in a 76–65 win over the Teikyo Nagaoka of Niigata Prefecture.

College career

Ranger

Freshman
On November 1, 2019, Tominaga made his collegiate debut for the Ranger College, against the Missouri State University–West Plains, scoring 19 points in a 100–84 win. On November 16, he logged a season-high 34 points in a 110–60 victory against Victoria College. On November 28, Tominaga verbally committed to play for NCAA Division I program Nebraska, under former NBA coach Fred Hoiberg for the 2021 class.  

As a freshman, Tominaga averaged 16.8 points, 2.3 rebounds and 0.7 assists per game while shooting 54.9 percent from the field and 47.9 percent from 3-point range. In his efforts, Tominaga earned the NJCAA All-Region V Team and the First Team All-Northern Texas Junior College Athletic Conference honors. He was also named conference Freshman of The Year, leading the conference in 3-point shooting and ranking sixth in both scoring and field goal percentage.

With Tominaga playing for Ranger College, the team finished the season with a 28–3 record, helping them clinch a position in the NJCAA national tournament. However, the season ended early due to COVID-19. Ranger eventually finished second in the NJCAA national rankings.

Sophomore
On November 11, 2020, Hoiberg announced that Tominaga has signed a National Letter of Intent to transfer to the University of Nebraska next season. 

On March 3, 2021, Tominaga scored a season-high 39 points, knocking down 11 3-pointers in a 113–102 win over Grayson College. Three days later, he had 26 points in a win against Temple College. In his efforts, Tominaga set a school record for career 3-pointers with 139, previously held by Brayan Au with 130. For his performance, Tominaga was named Northern Texas Junior College Athletic Conference Player of the Week for February 28 to March 6. On April 22, Tominaga posted a game-high 25 points, sinking five 3-pointers in an 87–83 win against South Plains College, sending the Rangers to the Final Four round of the NJCAA Division I Championship. Despite his team-high 26-point performance in the semifinals, the team lost to Cowley County Community College. Ranger College finished its season with a 23–5 record.

Tominaga averaged 16.3 points, 2.4 rebounds and 1.6 assists per game while shooting 51.0 percent from the field and 48.7 percent from 3-point range as a sophomore, earning him the NJCAA All-Region V Team and the First Team All-Northern Texas Junior College Athletic Conference honors for the second time in a row. He was named to the NJCAA Division I All-Tournament Team and was the recipient of the Charles Sesher Sportsmanship Award. Tominaga also earned the NJCAA Division I Second-Team All-American honors.

Nebraska

Second sophomore season
Tominaga transferred to the University of Nebraska on a full scholarship to play for the Cornhuskers. Due to COVID-19, the NCAA ruled that the 2020–21 season would not count against the eligibility of any student-athlete in any of the organization's winter sports, including basketball, giving Tominaga three years of eligibility instead of two. He made his debut for Nebraska on November 9, 2021, against Western Illinois, finishing with three points, one rebound and three steals across 18 minutes of play in a 75–74 loss. On November 27, Tominaga posted a season-high 23 points on 8-of-11 shooting from the field and 5-of-6 from three, along with two assists and two steals in an 83–70 win over South Dakota.

National team career

Junior national team
Tominaga made his international debut when he was selected to be a part of the Japanese squad that competed at the 2018 FIBA Under-16 Asian Championship, where he led the team in efficiency (13.3) and points (17.5) per game. His tournament highlights included a game-high 27-point outing, knocking down seven 3-pointers and scoring 19 points in five minutes in a 109–57 victory against India. Tominaga finished the tournament as the fourth-leading scorer. 

Later that year, Tominaga suited up for Japan at the 2018 FIBA Under-18 Asian Championship, leading the team in efficiency (14.6) and points (19.3) per game once more. In a game against Bahrain, Japan was down 70–58 with five minutes left to play, Tominaga then logged 11 points in two minutes, cutting the lead to three points. He finished the game with 33 points, helping Japan secure the win. Tominaga was the tournament’s fifth best scorer.

Senior national team 
Tominaga earned his first senior national team call up after being named to the 12-man roster that represented Japan for the third window of the 2023 FIBA Basketball World Cup Asian Qualifiers held in Australia. In his debut match against the tournament's host team, Tominaga scored a game-high 18 points, knocking down five 3-pointers coming off the bench. He led the team in scoring with 17.5 points per game, drilling down five 3-pointers. 

Following his impressive debut, Tominaga played for the national team at the 2022 FIBA Asia Cup. In the quarterfinals, Japan's first appearance since 2015, Tominaga logged a game-high 33 points, knocking down eight 3-pointers in a 99–85 loss against Australia. Tominaga finished the tournament ranking second in points (15.2) and third in efficiency (12.0) per game for the team.

3x3 national team
Tominaga represented Japan at the Asia-Europe Conference of the 2019 FIBA 3x3 Under-23 Nations League, where the team ranked last among six contenders.

Two years later, Tominaga starred for Japan at the 2020 Summer Olympics, where he became the youngest player to represent Japan in 3x3 basketball. He led the team in scoring with 6.9 points per game. Tominaga ranked near the top of a number of key categories in the tournament, including fourth in scoring, second in one-point shooting and seventh in two-point shooting.

Player profile 
Tominaga is known for his shooting ability beyond the arc and jump shot similar to famous NBA player Stephen Curry, which earned him the nickname the "Japanese Steph Curry".

Career statistics

College

NCAA Division I 

|-
| style="text-align:left;"| 2021–22
| style="text-align:left;"| Nebraska
| 30 || 11 || 16.5 || .373 || .330 || .842 || 1.5 || 0.6 || 0.8 || 0.0 || 5.7
|-
| style="text-align:left;"| 2022–23
| style="text-align:left;"| Nebraska
| 28 || 10 || 24.0 || .492 || .403 || .860 || 1.5 || 0.8 || 0.5 || 0.1 || 12.7
|- class="sortbottom"
| style="text-align:center;" colspan="2"| Career
| 58 || 21 || 20.1 || .448 || .372 || .855 || 1.5 || 0.7 || 0.6 || 0.1 || 9.1

JUCO

|-
| style="text-align:left;"| 2019–20
| style="text-align:left;"| Ranger
| 31 || 28 || 2.0 || .549 || .479 || .855 || 2.3 || 0.7 || 1.1 || 0.3 || 16.8
|-
| style="text-align:left;"| 2020–21
| style="text-align:left;"| Ranger
| 27 || 24 || 6.8 || .510 || .487 || .883 || 2.4 || 1.6 || 1.0 || 0.1 || 16.3
|- class="sortbottom"
| style="text-align:center;" colspan="2"| Career
| 58 || 52 || 4.4 || .530 || .483 || .869 || 2.4 || 1.1 || 1.1 || 0.2 || 16.6

Personal life
Tominaga was born on February 1, 2001, in Moriyama, Nagoya, Aichi, Japan to parents with basketball experience. His father, Hiroyuki, was a 6-foot-11 center, who played professional basketball for Mitsubishi Electric from 1996 to 2006 and was a member of the Japanese national team that competed during the 1998 FIBA World Championship. Tominaga’s mother, Hitomi, was an industrial league player also for the women's team of Mitsubishi Electric. Tominaga has one younger sister, Chihiro.

Footnotes

References

External links

 Nebraska Cornhuskers bio
 College career statistics from Sports-Reference.com
 Keisei Tominaga at olympics.com
Keisei Tominaga at fiba.basketball
 
 Keisei Tominaga at the 2018 FIBA U-18 Asian Championship at fiba.basketball
 Keisei Tominaga at the 2018 FIBA U-16 Asian Championship at fiba.basketball
 
 

2001 births
Living people
Sportspeople from Aichi Prefecture
Japanese men's basketball players 
Shooting guards
Japanese expatriate basketball people in the United States
Junior college men's basketball players in the United States
Nebraska Cornhuskers men's basketball players
3x3 basketball players at the 2020 Summer Olympics
Olympic 3x3 basketball players of Japan